Miss Earth Nuevo León is a pageant in Nuevo León, Mexico, that selects that state's representative for the national Miss Earth México pageant.

Titleholders
Below are the names of the annual titleholders of Miss Earth Nuevo León, listed in ascending order, and their final placements in the Miss Earth México after their participation.

See also
Mexicana Universal Nuevo León
Miss Nuevo León

External links
Official Website

Miss Earth México
Beauty pageants in Mexico
Nuevo León